The White Rose is a 1914 American short silent drama film, directed by Jack Harvey for the Thanhouser Company. It stars Boyd Marshall, Muriel Ostriche, and Ernest C. Warde.

References

External links

1914 films
American silent short films
Silent American drama films
1914 drama films
Films directed by Jack Harvey
Thanhouser Company films
1914 short films
American black-and-white films
1910s American films
American drama short films